Kadrikovo (Qaźırıq) is a rural locality (a village) in Tangatarovsky Selsoviet, Burayevsky District, Bashkortostan, Russia. The population was 7 as of 2010. There is one street.

Geography 
Kadrikovo is located 36 km west of Burayevo (the district's administrative centre) by road. Votkurzya is the nearest rural locality.

References 

Rural localities in Burayevsky District